Lydia Venieri (born 1964) is a Greek artist.

Personal life

Background

Venieri was born in Athens, Greece. She studied at the École nationale supérieure des Beaux-Arts. She has lived in Paris and is currently living in New York. Her web site dates from 1995, and showed some of the first Internet-based art.

Career

As artist
Venieri is well known
for her evocative sculpture installations which bridge mythology with current events, and for her ability to combine humor with self-reflection on human conditions in our times, through her characters that are taken from mythology, history, fairy tales and daily life. In her stories dreams reinforce reality and reality reinforce dreams.

The provocative visualizations of the universe of Venieri's work offer a Potnian statement about the world in flux in which we live.

She has had many exhibitions around the world.

She has been noted as;

She currently shows with Stux Gallery in New York, Gallery Quang in Paris, Galleri S.E in Norway, Tokyo Terra in Japan and Gallery Isabel Aninat in Chile.

Works

Projects
 Byronic Heros, 2017
 Tarot of Love, 2017
 The Dolphin Conspiracy, 2011
 TOMORROW ~ PHOSPHOR STARS IN WHITE NIGHTS, 2009
 See No Evil, 2008
 WarGames, 2006
 For Ever After, 2004
 Hibernation - Sleeping Beauty Conscience, 2002

iPhone art
 Moonlight, 2009

Animations and movies
 The Dolphin Conspiracy, 2009
 Tomorrow, 2006
 Epilisy, 2005
 Last Conflict, 2005
 For Ever After, 2004
 Sleeping Beauty Conscience, 2002
 Martha, 1996
 Egg, 1995

Books
 Moonlight, Lydia Venieri, 2006
 Beyond Being, Lydia Venieri, 2000
 60 Drawings for Healthy Perversions by Tzimy Panousi,  1995

Internet art
 Fin
 Her Story
 Apology
 Temple
 Tarot
 Isis

Theatre
 Set design for Sarah & Lorraine by Marc Israel-Le Pelletier, Sanford Meisner Theatre, New York.
 Set design for Sarah & Lorraine by Marc Israel-Le Pelletier, Storefront Theatre, Chicago.
 Set design for Hellenic Orchestra's tour of USSR, Soviet Union
 Set design & costumes for The Lady from Ancona, Anatolia of my Soul: 75 years since the Asian Minor Catastrophy, Theatre of Northern * * Greece, Drama & Lykabetus Theatre Atheans, 1997
 Set design for "Inventaires" de Philippe Minyana, directed by Elia Kountis, l'Institute Francais d'Athenes.
 Set design for Daphnis & Cloe, Octana Theatrical Group, Apothiki, Athens
 The lady form Ancona, Anatolia of my Soul: 75 years since the Asian Minor Catastrophy, Lykabetus Theatre, Athenia
 The Five Seasons, Dance theater Octana 1995

Awards and commissions

 Medal for Sculpture, Académie française de Paris, 2004
 Tower of Symbols, Open Air Sculpture, Central Athens, 2004
 Wall of Symbols, Sculpture, Atelier Mallet Stevens, Paris
 Lydia on Broadway, CD-ROM sponsored by Art Magazine and Hewlett Packard
 "Infinity", Collaboration with artist Takis on the sculpture.
 Commande en plein air d'une serie de sculpture Eros et Psyche, Fondation Alexandre Iolas, Athenes
 Commande d'une serie de sculptures pour l'Incitation à la Creation, Abbaye de Montmajour, Arles
 Carte Blanche, a l'occation de l'anniversaire de 10 ans du Centre Georges Pompidou, Galeries Contemporaines, Paris
 Commande en plein air d'une serie de  Eros et Psyche, Fondation Alexandre Iolas, Athenes
 Commande d'une serie de sculptures pour l'Incitation à la Creation, Abbaye de Montmajour, Arles
 Carte Blanche, a l'occation de l'anniversaire de 10 ans du Centre Georges Pompidou, Galeries Contemporaines, Paris

References

Further reading
 Nadja Argyropoulou (Author), Anastasia Aukeman (Author): 'Lydia Venieri: Theogony''. Charta 2011.

External links
 
 An Art Book - Theogony
 Stux Gallery - Lydia Venieri
 Gallery Quang
 Galleri S.E, Norway
 lydia venieri on Vimeo
 International
 Lydia Venieri The Last Conflict

1964 births
Living people
Lydia
American contemporary painters
American performance artists
American installation artists
American video artists
American women painters
Artists from Athens
Digital artists
Women digital artists
Greek performance artists
Greek painters
Greek sculptors
Greek comics artists
Artists from New York (state)
20th-century Greek women artists
21st-century Greek women artists
20th-century Greek sculptors
20th-century American painters
20th-century American women artists
21st-century American women artists
Greek female comics artists